Robyn Jean Thorn (born 26 November 1945), also known by her married name Robyn Nock, is an Australian former freestyle swimmer who won the silver medal in the 4×100-metre freestyle relay at the 1964 Summer Olympics in Tokyo.

Coming from Kingaroy, Queensland, Thorn spent the majority of her career in the shadow of fellow Australian Dawn Fraser.  Making her debut in the 1962 Commonwealth Games in Perth, Western Australia, Thorn was part of the winning 4×110-yard freestyle relay team, and won silver in the corresponding individual event behind Fraser.  Two years later in Tokyo, Thorn was a semifinalist in the 100-metre freestyle, won by Fraser.  She combined with Fraser, Lyn Bell and Janice Murphy to finish second, 3.1 seconds behind the United States.

See also
 List of Olympic medalists in swimming (women)

References
 
 

1945 births
Living people
Olympic swimmers of Australia
Australian female freestyle swimmers
Sportswomen from Queensland
Swimmers at the 1964 Summer Olympics
Medalists at the 1964 Summer Olympics
Olympic silver medalists for Australia
Olympic silver medalists in swimming
Swimmers at the 1962 British Empire and Commonwealth Games
Commonwealth Games medallists in swimming
Commonwealth Games silver medallists for Australia
Commonwealth Games gold medallists for Australia
20th-century Australian women
Medallists at the 1962 British Empire and Commonwealth Games